Shark Girl may refer to:

 Daffney (1975-2021), professional wrestler
 Shark Girl (novel), a 2007 novel in verse by Kelly Bingham
 "Shark Girl," a character by Casey Riordan Millard
 Shark-Girl, Brazilian super-heroine from Marvel Comics named Iara Dos Santos